Liberty of the Seas is a Royal Caribbean International  which entered regular service in May 2007. It was initially announced that she would be called Endeavour of the Seas, however this name was later changed. The 15-deck ship accommodates 3,634 passengers served by 1,360 crew. She was built in 18 months at the Aker Finnyards Turku Shipyard, Finland, where her sister ship, was also built.

Liberty of the Seas is the second of the Freedom-class vessels. A third ship, Independence of the Seas, was delivered in April 2008. In 2009, the first in a new  of ships measuring 220,000 gross tons displaced the Freedom class as the world's largest passenger ships.

History

On April 19, 2007, Liberty of the Seas was delivered to parent company Royal Caribbean Cruises Ltd.  On April 22, 2007 she made her first port of call Southampton, on a promotional visit.  She arrived at Cape Liberty Cruise Port on May 3, 2007.

On May 18, 2007, the ship was christened by Toronto-based travel agent Donnalea Madeley, who, along with her husband, is also the founder of the charity Hands Across the Nations.

In January 2011, Liberty of the Seas underwent renovations which included an outdoor video screen in the main pool area.

Later in 2011, Liberty of the Seas completed her first transatlantic repositioning cruise, moving from Miami, Florida to being home-ported in Barcelona, Spain. She stayed in Europe for the summer and part of fall, and then returned to Miami. Until 2015, Liberty of the Seas spent summers in Europe and winters in either Port of Miami or Port Everglades in Florida. In 2015, Liberty of the Seas repositioned to Cape Liberty Cruise Port in Bayonne, New Jersey from May to November, after which she repositioned to Galveston, Texas.

In February 2016, Liberty of the Seas again underwent renovations, adding additional cabins atop the front of the ship, introducing new restaurants, and making enhancements to the pool deck.

Incidents 
On 2 April 2020, it was reported that two crew members had tested positive for coronavirus.  One was asymptomatic, and remained in quarantine on board the ship, while the other, who showed visible symptoms, disembarked and was sent to a hospital in Galveston. On 15 April 2020, after the ship was anchored on the coast of Texas, it returned and docked in Galveston.

Facilities

Liberty of the Seas has extensive sports facilities including the FlowRider onboard wave generator for surfing, an interactive water play area for children, a full-sized volleyball / basketball court, an ice skating rink, and a large fitness center. There are also two whirlpools that are cantilevered and project out from the sides of the ship to provide unimpeded views of the sea below and a modular conference center for business meetings. Among other dining facilities there is a three level formal dining room.

A refurbishment in 2016 added a water slide complex, featuring two racing slides and a boomerang-style slide, and a children only water play area, featuring smaller water slides.

Many of the ship's interiors were extensively decorated by muralist Clarissa Parish.

References

External links

official website

Ships of Royal Caribbean International
Ships built in Turku
Cruise ships involved in the COVID-19 pandemic